Ione Skye Lee (Ione Skye Leitch; born September 4, 1970) is a British-born American actress and the daughter of singer Donovan. She made her film debut in the thriller River's Edge (1986) before gaining mainstream exposure for her starring role in Cameron Crowe's Say Anything... (1989). She continued to appear in films throughout the 1990s, with notable roles in Gas Food Lodging (1992), Wayne's World (1992) and One Night Stand (1997).

Other film credits include the comedy Fever Pitch (2005) and an uncredited role in Zodiac (2007). Skye also guest-starred on several television series, including The Twilight Zone (2002), Private Practice, and a recurring role on Arrested Development. She is also featured in the NBC series La Brea (2021).

In addition to acting, Skye also works as a painter, and has authored several children's books. In 2006, VH1 ranked her number 84 on its list of the 100 Greatest Teen Stars.

Early life 
Skye was born Ione Skye Leitch in Hampstead, London, the daughter of folk singer-songwriter Donovan and model Enid Karl (née Stulberger). Her father is Scottish-born with some Irish ancestry and grew up in England. Her mother is an American who was raised in the Bronx, New York City, and is Jewish. Her second name comes from the Isle of Skye. She is the younger sister of Camp Freddy singer Donovan Leitch. Skye's parents were separated at the time of her birth, and she was raised by her mother, having little to no contact with her father.

Skye grew up primarily in Los Angeles and San Francisco, and also spent time in Connecticut. She attended Immaculate Heart High School and Hollywood High School in Los Angeles.

Career 
Skye made her film debut with a supporting role in River's Edge in 1986, followed by a role as the title character in The Rachel Papers (1989). She played Diane Court, a withdrawn high school valedictorian, in the 1989 film Say Anything..., the feature film debut of director Cameron Crowe; the film attained a cult following and lent Skye international recognition.

In 1992, she played the role of Eleanor Grey on the short-lived television series Covington Cross, starred in Allison Anders's debut feature film Gas Food Lodging (which also featured Skye's brother Donovan Leitch), and had a supporting role in the Stephen La Rocque film Samantha. She subsequently had supporting roles as Elise in the comedy Wayne's World (1992) and the Mike Figgis-directed drama One Night Stand (1997).

She later appeared in the music video for the Harvey Danger song "Sad Sweetheart of the Rodeo." In 2007, Skye had a small, well-received part in the David Fincher film Zodiac.

In an interview with mondo-video.com in December 2010, Skye said she had not paid perfect attention to her career arc over the years, saying she "never struck when the iron was hot" when it came to going after big Hollywood roles in her 20s.

In 2013, she appeared in a supporting part in the independent horror film Haunt, with Jacki Weaver. In 2016, Skye directed the music video for the Against Me! single "333". The same year, she appeared in the short film Kitty, directed by Chloë Sevigny.

Other ventures 
In addition to acting, Skye is also a painter, and sells her own works. She also wrote the children's book My Yiddish Vacation, published by Henry Holt and Company in May 2014. Skye has cited comic book artist Daniel Clowes as an inspiration for her painting and writing.

Personal life 
For several years in the 1980s, Skye had a relationship with Anthony Kiedis, singer for the Red Hot Chili Peppers. Kiedis's 2004 book Scar Tissue contains a nude photo of the couple.

Skye married Adam Horovitz, a member of the Beastie Boys. The couple married in 1992, separated in 1995, and divorced in 1999.

Skye then had a relationship with furniture designer David Netto. They had a daughter, Kate, born December 2001. Skye's home in Hollywood, and Netto's apartment in New York City were featured in the February 2003 issue of Vogue. The two were engaged, but eventually separated.

In 2008, Skye became engaged to Australian musician Ben Lee. On December 29, 2008, Skye and Lee were married in a Hindu wedding ceremony in India. They have one daughter, Goldie Priya Lee, born September 24, 2009.

In an extensive 2015 interview, Skye discussed her struggle with addiction, including bouts with alcoholism and other drug use.

Filmography

Film

Television

Notes

References

External links 

Ione Skye Paintings

1970 births
American film actresses
American television actresses
Jewish American actresses
Living people
Actresses from Hertfordshire
Jewish English actresses
English people of Scottish descent
British emigrants to the United States
20th-century American actresses
21st-century American actresses
Alumni of Immaculate Heart High School, Los Angeles
Actresses from Los Angeles
Actresses from San Francisco
Actresses from Connecticut
20th-century English women
20th-century English people
21st-century English women
21st-century English people
21st-century American Jews
LGBT actresses
English LGBT people
LGBT Jews